U.S. Everlasting Records was an American record label which was in operation from 1908 to 1912. It issued two-minute and four-minute phonographic cylinders made of celluloid, and released over 1000 titles.

The label Lakeside was used when the records were sold by Montgomery Ward department stores.

Artists on the label included popular singers such as Ada Jones, Arthur Collins, Will Oakland, Frank C. Stanley, Walter Van Brunt, and Henry Burr, and the popular vocal group Peerless Quartet. The label also issued both popular and classical instrumental music.

References

External links
Listen to some of their cylinder recordings at UCSB Cylinder Audio Archive
Vintage advertisements at "78-RPM RECORDS, CYLINDER RECORDS & PHONOGRAPHS", Mainspring Press

Record labels established in 1908
American record labels
Cylinder record producers
1908 establishments in the United States